The Sparticle Mystery is a British science fiction television series written and created by Alison Hume and produced by Sparticles Productions for CBBC. The series follows a group of ten children within modern Britain, where an experiment at a Large Hadron Collider-like facility, the Sparticle Project, goes wrong, sending anybody aged 15 and over into a parallel dimension at exactly 11:11am. The children travel to the Sparticle Project in an attempt to bring back the adults and re-align the two dimensions.

The series, which had a budget of £3 million, was filmed in and around Bristol, with the final episode filmed at the ISIS neutron source particle accelerators, near Didcot. Series 2 was extremely popular, with over 2 million hits on BBC iPlayer. Series 3 regularly topped the BARB top ten children's shows during transmission. In general, the series has received mixed to positive reception, with a score of 7.3 on IMDb.

The programme, which stars Annette Badland as Doomsday Dora/Holodora, has similar themes to both the 1975 TV series The Changes and the Gone series, and has many similarities to The Tribe; however, it is noted for its difference in that the children desire to bring back the adults. The second series of The Sparticle Mystery was filmed across Yorkshire in July- September 2012 and broadcast in 2013. A third series was filmed in 2014 in and around Belfast, Northern Ireland with the support of Northern Ireland Screen, and the first episode was broadcast on 5 January 2015. The third and final series ended on 30 March 2015. Video-on-demand rights to The Sparticle Mystery were acquired by Amazon UK Prime in 2015 and Series 1 & 2 were available to watch until 2017. In the US, Seasons 1 and 2 are available from Netflix. Series 3 is available on the BBC Store.

From 2019, The Sparticle Mystery Series 1 was available to watch on BBC iPlayer in the UK, but as of 2022 it is not.

Synopsis

Series 1 
The Sparticle Mystery follows a group of 11 children left to fend for themselves within modern-day Earth after a science experiment at 'The Sparticle Project' goes wrong, resulting in all those of age 15 and over disappearing into a parallel universe, at precisely 11:11a.m.

Initially, the world becomes their exciting playground. With adults' rules, law and order all removed, the youngsters have great fun fulfilling many wishes, including raiding sweetshops etc. However, as the world's resources start to dwindle and daily survival gets harder, the youngsters resolve to bring the adults back by venturing to the top secret 'Sparticle Project'. They are aided in their quest by a number of clues left before the disappearance by a woman named 'Doomsday' Dora, a scientist who worked on the Sparticle Project. Along the way they have many adventures and learn important life skills.

Early in episode one we discover that in this 'post-disappearance' world, opportunistic gangs soon come to inhabit the streets. This prompts the lead male character Sadiq to usher his newly formed tribe to safety in the City Hotel. After discovering her Mum and older sister missing, a scientifically minded young girl called Kat takes charge of Liam, the small boy next door. They too try to gain entry to the City Hotel, but only Liam gets in, leaving Kat to initially fend for herself, before Sadiq caves in and allows her entry. One of the tribe, a young girl called Reese, soon starts to experience strange events, which eventually turn out to be the manifestation of her own latent psychic powers.

Kat and Reese quickly deduce that the Sparticle Project is behind the adults' disappearance. The 'Sparticles' tribe then split in two: the 'Ranchers', Tia and Jeffrey (who has cerebral palsy), who stay at City Hotel with the two younger kids, Liam and Frankie, and the 'Questers', (Sadiq, Kat, Jordan, Ami, Holly and Reese), who go in search of the Sparticle Project. Also featured is Callum, a tough streetwise young teen, whom at first appears to be the Sparticles' enemy, but later joins their side. When a girl living at The Sparticle Project interferes with the machine, Reese and Muna, another child with special powers trapped between dimensions, step in to try and fix the problem, but Kat chooses Reese over the adults and shuts down the machine permanently. Before she disappears, Doomsday Dora tells the Questers to travel to the Quantum Nexus and gives them a mysterious key.

Series 2 
One year later, the team continue to attempt to bring back the adults by locating the Quantum Nexus after it is discovered that the key unlocks a further clue leading to specific treasures that will guide the children there. It quickly becomes a race between the Sparticles (except Kat, Ami, Jordan and Holly) and Fizzy's deputy Serena, who is joined by Holly. Along the way, the Sparticles discover more children have powers like Reese, and name them "Sensitives." After following clues relating to the "Artos" tribe, the Sparticles are joined by Serena, who was secretly a double agent, in stopping Fizzy, Ernesto and Holly from destroying the Quantum Nexus with Reese, who switches sides after receiving a warning from Muna. Reese interferes with the process of reuniting the children's and the adults’ dimension using her sensitive powers and the adults arrive in the children's dimension as teenagers.

Series 3 
In the third season, the world becomes taken over by the newly arrived Queen Kylie, who locks up the remaining Sparticles (Sadiq, Reese, Serena, Holly and Frankie). Kylie's brother Erimon releases the Sparticles but is unable to recapture them, and the Sparticles (joined by the sensitive Aris, Holly's teen mother Kim and Ernesto) embark on a mission to rid the world of the Teen Parents and send them home to the 1980s. While travelling around the country in one of Queen Kylie's stolen tracker vans, Reese discovers "The Circle of Perpetual Time" which, when 7 sensitives are linked up with it, will be able to send the parents home using the power of an energy-boosting Comet. Holly becomes pregnant with Ernesto's child, who turns out to be the final sensitive. At the end, the Sparticles eventually bring the teen parents to their dimensions and bring back the parents.

Cast and crew

The main characters in The Sparticle Mystery are all children, of different ages and ethnic groups, many of whom were new to acting. Included in the main cast were: 16-year-old Megan Jones as Tia; 8-year-old Oliver Bell as Liam; Wesley Nelson (who has cerebral palsy) as Jeffrey; Karim Zeroual as Sadiq. Due to the age of the actors there were large changes in the cast between series. Given the premise of the show, the adult cast was minimal, but notable are Annette Badland as 'Doomsday' Dora, and Larissa Wilson as Anita.

Series overview
{| class="wikitable plainrowheaders" style="text-align:center"
! scope="col" colspan="2" rowspan="2" | Series
! scope="col" rowspan="2" | Episodes
! scope="col" colspan="2" | Originally aired
|-
! scope="col" | First aired
! scope="col" | Last aired
|-
| scope="row" style="background:#4FA494; color:#4FA494; text-align:center;"|
| 1
| 13
| 14 February 2011
| 6 March 2011
|-
| scope="row" style="background:#2A6413; color:#fff;; text-align:center;"|
| 2
| 10
| 11 February 2013
| 22 February 2013
|-
| scope="row" style="background:#882D17; color:#882D17; text-align:center;"|
| 3
| 13
| 5 January 2015
| 30 March 2015
|}

Episode list

Series 1 (2011)

Series 2 (2013)

Series 3 (2015)

References

External links
 

Screen Terrier

BBC children's television shows
2011 British television series debuts
BBC mystery television shows
British science fiction television shows
2010s British children's television series
Television series about parallel universes
Teenage pregnancy in television
British fantasy television series
2010s British science fiction television series
Television series about children
Television series about teenagers